Ball of fish may refer to:

Fish ball, a common food in Asian cuisine made from finely ground fish
Bait ball, a defensive behavior exhibited by pelagic fish